Snehalata or Snehlata may refer to

 Snehlata Shrivastava, Secretary General of the Lok Sabha
 Snehlata Nath, Indian activist
 Snehlata Deshmukh, Former Vice Chancellor of the University of Mumbai
 Snehalata Reddy, Indian film actress
 Snehalata Kolhe, Indian politician 
 Snehalata V. Huzurbazar, American statistician